Cai Sheng (born 12 November 1971) is a Chinese football manager and a former international forward. He represented Wuhan and Qingdao in his club career while internationally he played for China in 1992 Asian Cup.

Career statistics

International

Honours

Player

Club
China national football B team
 Chinese Jia-A League: 1989

Wuhan
 Chinese Jia-B League: 1997

References

External links
Team China Stats

1971 births
Living people
Chinese footballers
Chinese football managers
Footballers from Hubei
China international footballers
Wuhan Guanggu players
Association football forwards